The 2005–06 season was Fulham's fifth consecutive season in the top flight of English football, the Premier League.

Season summary
Fulham were again managed by Chris Coleman and they managed to achieve a 12th-place finish in the Premier League, one place higher than the previous season. Their best results of the season were home wins against Chelsea (1–0) and Liverpool (2–0).

In the League Cup, they reached the third round by winning an exciting game against Lincoln City 5–4 after extra time, but they then succumbed to West Bromwich Albion. In the FA Cup, they fell at the first hurdle with a humiliating 2–1 home defeat to Leyton Orient.

Players

First-team squad
Squad at end of season

Left club during season

Reserve squad

Statistics

Starting 11
Considering starts in all competitions
 GK: #30,  Tony Warner, 18
 RB: #2,  Moritz Volz, 23
 CB: #6,  Zat Knight, 31
 CB: #3,  Carlos Bocanegra, 20
 LB: #17,  Liam Rosenior, 25
 RM: #13,  Tomasz Radzinski, 24
 CM: #4,  Steed Malbranque, 33
 CM: 14,  Papa Bouba Diop, 21
 LM: #11,  Luís Boa Morte, 37
 CF: #20,  Brian McBride, 34
 CF: #15,  Collins John, 18

Transfers

Summer

In

Out

Winter

In

Out on loan

Club

The Management

Other Information

Competitions

Overall
Premier League:12th
League Cup:3rd Round
FA Cup:3rd Round

Premier League

League table

Results summary

Results By Round

Matches

Premier League

FA Cup

League Cup

References

Notes

External links
 Fulham website

Fulham F.C. seasons
Fulham